Desulfonatronum thioautotrophicum is a species of haloalkaliphilic sulfate-reducing bacteria. It is able to grow lithotrophically by dismutation of thiosulfate and sulfite.

References

Further reading

External links 
LPSN

Genbank entry for its dissimilatory sulfite reductase alpha subunit (dsrA) and dissimilatory sulfite reductase beta subunit (dsrB) genes
Type strain of Desulfonatronum thioautotrophicum at BacDive -  the Bacterial Diversity Metadatabase

Bacteria described in 2011
Desulfovibrionales